Čachrov is a market town in Klatovy District in the Plzeň Region of the Czech Republic. It has about 500 inhabitants.

Administrative parts
Villages of Bradné, Březí, Chřepice, Chvalšovice, Dobřemilice, Javorná, Jesení, Kunkovice, Onen Svět, Předvojovice, Svinná and Zahrádka are administrative parts of Čachrov.

Gallery

References

Populated places in Klatovy District
Market towns in the Czech Republic